Minnie is the fifth and final studio album by American R&B/jazz singer Minnie Riperton. She died of cancer two months after its release. This was also her first album for Capitol Records.
With a new record deal under her belt and a guarantee from the label of priority marketing and promotion, Minnie went right to work on what would be her final album. With husband Richard Rudolph, Keni St. Lewis, Gene Dozier, Randy Waldman, Marlo Henderson and Bill Thedford contributing songs, the album served as Minnie’s final statement to the music world and fans.

Background
Minnie brought son Marc and daughter Maya Rudolph into the studio to sing background on "Dancin' & Actin' Crazy," while the tender "Lover & Friend" (featuring a reunion with Stevie Wonder, once again under the pseudonym of El Toro Negro) was the perfect ode to her relationship with Richard. Minnie was at her most playful self on her remake of the Doors' "Light My Fire", a duet with José Feliciano (who had a hit with his own version of this rock classic in 1968). It's been said that the reason we don't hear José until the second half of the song is because he just happened to be at the studio when it was being recorded and popped in.

When not recording, Minnie was busy as the national spokesperson for the American Cancer Society, lobbying the cause for early breast cancer detection. As a result of her efforts, she was presented with the A.C.S. Courage Award at the White House by President Jimmy Carter. While promoting this album, TV appearances kept her busy – The Mike Douglas Show, The Merv Griffin Show, The Tonight Show. Despite her radiant and expressive face, the cameras could not hide how the cancer was ravaging her body. During her last appearance on The Mike Douglas Show, her right arm was in a fixed position from the cancer's progression.

Singles
The first single released from the album was "Memory Lane". A music video was filmed for the song and released on the Capitol Records home video Revised Soul which also featured Riperton's labelmates at the time, Tavares, Natalie Cole and A Taste of Honey. The video was filmed on May 25, 1979 - a little over a month before her death from cancer on July 12, 1979. Posthumous singles included "Lover and Friend" and "Dancin' & Actin' Crazy".

Track listing

Personnel
Minnie Riperton - vocals
Mitch Holder, Phil Upchurch, Art Phillips, Marlo Henderson - guitar
Oscar Castro-Neves - acoustic guitar
Abraham Laboriel, Chuck Rainey, David Hungate - bass
Jeremy Lubbock, Randy Waldman - electric piano, synthesizer
Harvey Mason, Alex Acuña, Leon "Ndugu" Chancler - drums
Paulinho da Costa, Steve Forman, Master Henry Gibson - percussion
Victor Feldman - vibraphone, piano
Claudio Slon - drums, cymbals
Jerry Hey, Kim Hutchcroft, Larry Williams, David Duke, Richard Perissi, Vincent DeRosa - horns
Hubert Laws, Buddy Collette, Jerome Richardson, Sheridon Stokes, William Green, Tom Scott - flute
Bill Reichenbach - trombone
Gerald Vinci - violin
Bili Thedford, Dani McCormick, Venetta Fields, Dali Shelby, Sandra Riperton Brewer, Sidney Barnes - backing vocals
Technical
Charles William Bush - photography

Charts 

Singles

References 

1979 albums
Capitol Records albums
Minnie Riperton albums
Albums recorded at A&M Studios
Albums produced by Henry Lewy